Amalau is the name of a valley and a bay within the National Park of American Samoa. Amalau Valley is located between Vatia and Afono, and it is an isolated valley with various wildlife such as large numbers of native bird species and flying fox megabats. Amalau Valley is reached on the road leading to Vatia. There are only a few homes at Amalau.

A significant site in the valley contains the remains of an old village. The Tu'ulaumea Tupua near Amalau Valley is an important legendary site. In Amalau Cove, pillow lavas can be observed along the shoreline. The pillow lavas indicate extrusion under water. The beach at the head of Amalau Bay is a mixture of cobbles and basaltic boulders, also with big chunks of coral which have been rounded by the ocean waves.

Amalau Valley has been described as a “prime bird- and bat-watching area."

Wildlife

Amalau Valley has been described as the best place in American Samoa to observe the Many-colored Fruit Dove. There are also large numbers of White-tailed Tropicbirds, White Terns, and Brown Noddies present. Amalau Valley is a particularly great site to observe fruit bats, especially the Samoa flying fox. 

The Samoan flying fox can easily be observed in the Amalau Valley during early morning or in the late afternoon. At some parts of the year, the bats remain visible throughout the day. A raised “Bat Observation Tower” platform has been proposed erected in the Amalau Valley in order to allow visitors to observe avifauna such as the flying foxes who frequent this area.

References

Tutuila
Protected areas of American Samoa
Geography of American Samoa
Landforms of American Samoa
Tourist attractions in American Samoa
Fauna of Samoa